Aegopogon is a genus of New World plants in the grass family.

 Species
 Aegopogon bryophilus Döll - Colombia, Venezuela, Ecuador, Peru, Bolivia, Brazil (Minas Gerais, Rio de Janeiro), Argentina (Tucumán, Salta, Jujuy)
 Aegopogon cenchroides Humb. & Bonpl. ex Willd. - Mexico, Central America, Colombia, Venezuela, Guyana, Ecuador, Peru, Bolivia, Rio de Janeiro
 Aegopogon solisii G.A.Levin - Socorro Islands in Mexico
 Aegopogon tenellus (DC.) Trin. - Mexico, Central America, Venezuela, Arizona, California

 formerly included
see Amphipogon, Bouteloua

See also
 List of Poaceae genera

References

External links
 Grassbase - The World Online Grass Flora

Poaceae genera
Taxa named by Aimé Bonpland
Taxa named by Alexander von Humboldt
Chloridoideae